The molecular formula C13H24N2O (molar mass: 224.34 g/mol, exact mass: 224.1889 u) may refer to:

 Cuscohygrine
 Dicyclohexylurea

Molecular formulas